The Dominican Republic national U-19 basketball team (Dominican Republic Youth national basketball team), is the representative for the Dominican Republic in international basketball competitions, and it is organized and run by the Federación Dominicana de Baloncesto. The Dominican Republic national U-19 basketball team represents the Dominican Republic at the FIBA Under-19 World Championship.

FIBA Under-19 World Championship

References

See also
Dominican Republic national basketball team

U-19 National team
Men's national under-19 basketball teams
National sports teams of the Dominican Republic